Channel 9 is a Bangladeshi Bengali-language satellite and cable television channel owned by Virgo Media Limited. Based in the Panthapath neighborhood of Dhaka, the channel began broadcasting on 30 January 2012. The channel airs sports and entertainment programming, and formerly aired news until the closure of its news division in 2019. It had the rights to broadcast the Bangladesh Premier League and La Liga.

History 
The Bangladesh Telecommunication Regulatory Commission granted Channel 9 a license to broadcast among other privately owned Bangladeshi television channels on 20 October 2009. It commenced test transmissions on 8 April 2011, and officially began broadcasting on 30 January 2012.

On 14 April 2012, the channel launched on Sky in the United Kingdom and Ireland, where it replaced NTV. The channel was broadcast free-to-air on Eutelsat 28A. This closed on 27 June 2014 and was replaced by Iqra Bangla, a sister channel to Iqra TV. It has been rumoured that Channel 9 will launch on Talk Talk Youview platform but no further information has been released.

In September 2017, in observance of Eid al-Adha, the telefilm Boro Chele aired on Channel 9, which went viral on YouTube. On 21 May 2021, Channel 9, along with SA TV, was obliged to temporarily cease operations over unpaid satellite transponder fees, according to authorities. It was also announced that Channel 9 would resume transmissions by 23 May, which it did.

Programming

List of programming 
 Aşk Ağlatır (title localized as Akash Jure Megh)
 Bachelor Point
 Bohe Somantoral
 Dekha Dekhi
 Dhonni Meye
 Grandmaster
 Rabbu Bhai-er Bou
 Traveler's Story

Key people
Chairman: Syeda Mahbuba Akhter, wife of retired Major General Syed Shafayetul Islam, son of Syed Nazrul Islam.

Managing Director: Enayetur Rahman Bappy is the managing director of Channel 9. He resigned from NTV and joined the company.

See also
 List of television stations in Bangladesh

References

External links
 

Television channels and stations established in 2011
Television channels in Bangladesh
2011 establishments in Bangladesh